This is a list of Bollywood films that were released in 2020.

Box office collection
The highest-grossing Bollywood films released in 2020, by worldwide box office gross revenue, are as follows.

January–March

April–June
Films were not released theatrically from 17 March till 14 October due to the COVID-19 pandemic.

July–September

October–December

See also
 List of Bollywood films of 2021
 List of Bollywood films of 2019

Notes 
Films were not released theatrically from 17 March till 14 October due to the COVID-19 pandemic.

References

2020
Bollywood
Bollywood